Xiaguan may refer to the following locations in China:

Xiaguan District (下关区), Nanjing
Xiaguan, Neixiang County (夏馆镇), town in Neixiang County, Henan
Xiaguan, Dali City (下关镇), town in Yunnan
Xiaguan, Shangyu (下管镇), town in Shangyu, Zhejiang